Count Godefried (died 1161) was Count of Montaigu and Clermont by inheritance, and Count of Duras by virtue of his marriage. He was also seigneur (lord) of Rochefort, and burger and advocate of Dinant.

His parents were Lambert, Count of Montaigu and Clermont, and his wife Gertrud.

Godfried married Juliane, daughter of Otto II, Count of Duras, and his wife Berthe of Valenciennes. They had five children:
 Gilles, Count of Montaigu, Clermont and Duras
 Pierre de Montaigu (d. 1185 or after), Canon at Saint-Lambert, Liège
 Conan II, Count of Montaigu, Clermont and Duras
 Gerberge de Montaigu (d. after 29 June 1206), married to Wery II de Walcourt
 Clarissa de Montaigu.

Upon the death of Godfried, his son Gilles inherited all three counties. Pierre is also listed as a Count of Montaigu, but as he died before his older brother, it is not clear that he ever actually held the title. After Conon's death, his brother-in-law Wery II de Walcourt became Count of Montaigu and Clermont, whereas Gérard II, Count of Looz, became the Count of Duras.

Notes

Sources 
Wolters, Joseph Mathias, Notice Historique sur l’Ancien Comté de Duras en Hesbaie, Gyselinck, 1855 (available on Google Books)
.

External links
Medieval Lands Project, Comtes de Montaigu
Medieval Lands Project, Seigneurs de Walcourt

1161 deaths
Counts of Montaigu
Jure uxoris officeholders